Jean-Luc Ettori (born 29 July 1955) is a French former professional footballer who played as goalkeeper. He spent his entire career with AS Monaco, and had held the record for the most appearances by any player in Ligue 1 or Division 1 with 602 appearances until 4 December 2013 when Mickaël Landreau surpassed his record. He earned nine caps for France in the early 1980s, including starting six out of seven matches in the 1982 World Cup.

Honours
Monaco
Ligue 1: 1977–78 1981–82, 1987–88
Coupe de France: 1980, 1985, 1991
Trophée des Champions: 1985

Orders
Chevalier of the Ordre national du Mérite: 1994

References

External links

 French Football Federation Profile 

1955 births
Living people
French footballers
Footballers from Marseille
Association football goalkeepers
France international footballers
1982 FIFA World Cup players
Ligue 1 players
INF Vichy players
AS Monaco FC players
French football managers
Ligue 1 managers
AS Monaco FC managers
Knights of the Ordre national du Mérite